Astroworld Festival is an annual music festival run by American rapper and singer Travis Scott, held in Houston, Texas, at NRG Park, near the former site of Six Flags AstroWorld. The festival was first held in November 2018.

The 2020 festival was canceled due to the COVID-19 pandemic in Texas. Astroworld Festival 2021 was originally scheduled for November 5–6, 2021. On the first night, a crowd crush occurred, resulting in the deaths of ten people and the cancellation of the second night of the festival. The cause of death for all ten victims was ruled compression asphyxia. This mass casualty event has called action onto performers, venues, security teams, and ticket promoters to ensure better safety for concertgoers. Following the Astroworld Festival, many celebrities and performers wished their condolences to the victims, families, and all that were affected. Astroworld Festival had an effect on Travis Scott's career and brands, as it also highlighted his past recklessness when performing.

History

The festival was launched in 2018, the same year that Scott released his album of the same name. The motivations of the festival were described as “bring[ing] back the beloved spirit and nostalgia of AstroWorld, making a childhood dream of Travis’ come true.“ The original lineup featured mostly hip-hop artists such as Young Thug, Post Malone, Metro Boomin and Scott himself. Performances generally alternate between two stages called "Thrills" and "Chills" with the "Chills" stage being the larger of the two. The making of the festival as well as the album were the subjects of the 2019 Netflix original film, Look Mom I Can Fly.

The festival returned in 2019 with an expanded lineup. In addition to hip hop artists, artists of other genres such as Rosalía and Marilyn Manson, who perform nuevo flamenco and hard rock respectively, added different genres to the festival. The festival was reported to increase in attendance from the 2018 edition, up to 50,000. Prior to the festival, three people were injured in an incident where barricades placed outside the entrance collapsed and fans rushed to enter the festival.

The 2020 festival was canceled due to the COVID-19 pandemic in Texas, with a promised return in 2021. Scott partnered with Epic Games to produce a virtual event for its video game Fortnite Battle Royale entitled "Astronomical", which featured a 15-minute in-game presentation inspired by the Astroworld album and its visuals (which featured the premiere of Scott's new collaboration with Kid Cudi, "The Scotts"), and in-game challenges, skins, and cosmetic items inspired by Scott. The presentation premiered on April 23, with reruns for different time zones on April 24 and 25.

Tickets for the 2021 edition went on sale on May 5, 2021, with the event expanding into a planned two-night festival on November 5 and 6, 2021. Ticket sales for the festival rose to 100,000, double that of 2019. Despite a steep rise in ticket prices, tickets sold out within 30 minutes. A series of events known as "Astroweek" was held to lead into the festival, including celebrity softball and golf events in support of Scott's Cactus Jack Foundation, pop-up stores (including a sneaker collaboration with Nike), and the unveiling of a community garden at Young Elementary School dedicated to Scott's grandmother (who joined Scott and other family members as part of its ribbon-cutting). Astroweek was to conclude on November 8 with a drive-in screening at the Moonstruck Drive-In Cinema of the film Red Rocket featuring Scott and appearances by the film's writer Sean Baker, and its cast. The drive-in screening was canceled due to the crowd crush event. At least a dozen lawsuits have been filed in the aftermath of the 2021 festival.

2021 crowd crush 

On the night of November 5, about 50,000 people attended the sold out Astroworld Festival. Eight people were killed in a crowd crush, and a further 11 others went into cardiac arrest, according to Harris County and Houston city officials. At least two more people died later from injuries sustained during the event, bringing the death toll to ten. The crush began around 9:15 p.m. and was declared a mass casualty event by 9:38 p.m. Over 300 people were treated for injuries at the festival related to the crowd crush. Cardiopulmonary resuscitation was performed by show paramedics on those injured. Despite the presence of ambulances in the crowd, which was noticed by Scott, the performance continued for over thirty minutes past the time that the mass casualty event was declared, with Scott's performance ending around 10:10 or 10:15 p.m. This followed earlier events at around 2 p.m. in which attendees rushed an entrance to the grounds, knocking down security barricades and trampling concert-goers. The earlier crowd atmosphere prompted Houston Police Chief Troy Finner to warn Scott of potential danger in a private meeting prior to the night's performance. The second night of the concert, to be held on November 6, was canceled.

Victims  
The Harris County medical examiner's office said all 10 deaths were due to compression asphyxia.

Franco Patino, 21

John Hilgert, 14

Brianna Rodriguez, 16

Rudy Peña, 23

Danish Baig, 27

Jacob E. Jurinek, 20

Alex Acosta, 21

Madison Dubiski, 23

Bharti Shahani, 22

Ezra Blount, 9

Response from Travis Scott and Friends 
The morning after the deadly performance, Scott released his initial statement. This statement was posted on Twitter and says "I'm absolutely devastated by what took place last night. My prayers go out to the families and all those impacted by what happened at Astroworld Festival. Houston PD has my total support as they continue to look into the tragic loss of life. I am committed to working together with the Houston community to heal and support the families in need. Thank you to Houston PD, Fire Department and NRG Park for their immediate response and support. Love You All." Nearly a month after the deadly crowd rush, Travis Scott did an interview with Charlamagne tha God which was posted on Youtube on December 9, 2021. During the 50 minute interview, Scott displayed numerous emotions, beginning the interview by claiming he is an "emotional rollercoaster". In the interview, Charlamagne asked many times who the responsibility falls on for the safety of the concertgoers in which Scott replied "professionals".  Travis Scott included his timeline of the disaster, saying that he was not aware of the deaths until minutes before the press conference.  In addition, he included that he never heard distress from the crowd which would have caused him to stop the show. Scott told Charlamagne that he stopped his performance a couple of times to ensure that his attendees were OK, including that he goes off the fans' energy as a collective and did not hear any distress. Scott offered to cover the funeral costs for all 10 of the victims. According to attorneys of the families, at least 7 of the victims' families rejected his offer. Travis Scott's legal team said the offer to pay for funeral costs would not have any impact on the lawsuits against Scott that were filed by the families.

Travis Scott's girlfriend, Kylie Jenner, was in attendance with her sister Kendall Jenner and daughter Stormi Webster. On an Instagram story posted by Kylie Jenner she shared her sympathy and condolences to the victims and families. In the story, Kylie Jenner wrote "Travis and I are broken and devastated. My thoughts and prayers are with all who lost their lives, were injured or affected in any way by yesterday's events." During the performance, Kylie Jenner posted on Instagram multiple videos and pictures where an ambulance can be seen while Scott is performing. In her statement she included that both her and Scott "weren't aware of any fatalities until the news came out after the show and in no world would have continued filming or performing". Kendall Jenner also released a statement on her Instagram story following the incident. Kendall Jenner's statement said, "I'm truly broken for the families that have lost loved ones and my prayers go out to everyone involved, sending everyone who has been affected all of my love and wishing them strength during this incredibly devastating and sensitive time."

Aftermath 
Travis Scott was scheduled to be a headliner at Coachella 2022, the festival pulled his spot due to the aftermath at Astroworld. In 2021 Scott released Cacti, an agave spiked seltzer, which has stopped all production after Astroworld to focus on the victims and aftermath of the mass casualty. In addition, his partnership with Fortnite was delayed as they pulled all Scott's emotes from the game.

There have been around 300 lawsuits filed after Astroworld. The majority of these lawsuits filed have pointed fingers at Scott, Live Nation, promoters, the venue, and the many security companies. Scott has released a new project called Project HEAL. The project is broken down into four categories: "a Waymon Webster HBCU scholarship, an expansion of the CACT.US Youth Design Center, free mental health resources, and a U.S. Conference of Mayors Task Force of Event Safety". Project HEAL is funded by Scott himself, a multi-million dollar promise towards the project as well as a portion of his proceeds from his product launches. From Scotts HEAL website, the project will "bring together all of the relevant stakeholders from government, public safety, emergency response, health care, event management, music, and technology. It will be the first time all of these groups and individuals will work together to most effectively address the safety challenges faced by future large-scale events." A year after the crowd rush, Scott released a photo on Instagram with girlfriend, Kylie Jenner. He did not comment on the anniversary of the death of the 10 victims from Astroworld. Since the mass casualty, Scott has done collaborations with Nike and Dior.

Previous Incidents 
Scott has held a reputation of recklessness and chaos over the years due to these concerts. In 2015, Scott was performing at [Lollapalooza] and encouraged fans to climb over security rails to get onto the stage. Following that incident, Scott pleaded guilty to reckless conduct charges.  In 2017, a fan of Scott sued him after a performance in Manhattan. The fan described being pushed from a third story balcony then dragged onto stage with Scott. This resulted in the fan becoming paralyzed. In 2019, at Astroworld, 3 people were hospitalized due to being trampled by the crowd.

Lineups

2021

November 5
All performances occurred at the Thrills stage with the exception of Scott and Drake's combined performance.

Metro Boomin
Master P 
Yves Tumor
Toro y Moi
Don Toliver 
Roddy Ricch
Lil Baby
SZA
Travis Scott
Drake (unannounced performance with Travis Scott)

November 6
All November 6 performances were canceled. The following artists had been scheduled to perform:

Teezo Touchdown
SoFaygo
Maxo Kream + Houston All Stars
Sheck Wes
BIA
Chief Keef
Earth, Wind & Fire
Baby Keem
21 Savage
Bad Bunny
Tame Impala
Young Thug + YSL

2019
In order of performance. Performances started on the Thrills stage and alternated between it and the Chills stage.

Tay Keith
Don Toliver
Pop Smoke
Sheck Wes
Young Dolph + Key Glock
Houston All Stars
Megan Thee Stallion
DaBaby
Gucci Mane
Playboi Carti
Young Thug
Migos
Marilyn Manson
Pharrell
Rosalía
Travis Scott
Kanye West (unannounced performance during Travis Scott's set)

2018
In order of performance. Performances started on the Chills stage and alternated between it and the Thrills stage.

Tommy Genesis
Smokepurpp
Virgil Abloh
Trippie Redd
Metro Boomin
Sheck Wes
Houston All-Stars
Gunna
Young Thug
Rae Sremmurd
Post Malone
Lil Wayne
Travis Scott

References

External links
 

Astroworld Festival crowd crush
Festivals in Houston
Music festivals in Texas
Pop music festivals in the United States